Ghattamaneni Siva Rama Krishna Murthy (31 May 1943 – 15 November 2022), known mononymously as Krishna, was an Indian actor, director and producer known for his works predominantly in Telugu cinema. In a film career spanning five decades, he starred in more than 350 films in a variety of roles. He is referred to as "Superstar" in the Telugu media. In 2009, the government of India honoured him with the Padma Bhushan for his contributions to Indian cinema. He was elected as a Member of Parliament for the Congress party in 1989. In 1997, he received the Filmfare Lifetime Achievement Award – South in addition to Honorary doctorate from Andhra University in 2008. He died on 15 November 2022 due to cardiac arrest.

Krishna began his film career with minor roles in films such as Kula Gothralu (1961), Padandi Mundhuku (1962), and Paruvu Prathishta (1963). He debuted as a lead actor with the 1965 film Thene Manasulu and went on to star in films such as Sakshi (1967), which won critical acclaim at the Tashkent film festival in 1968. In 1972, he starred in Pandanti Kapuram, which garnered the National Film Award for Best Feature Film in Telugu for that year. He has essayed roles across different genres including mythological, drama, western, fantasy, action, spy and historical films.

Krishna was credited with producing many technological firsts in the Telugu film industry such as the first Cinemascope film – Alluri Seetarama Raju (1974), the first Eastmancolor film – Eenadu (1982), the first 70mm film – Simhasanam (1986), the first DTS film – Telugu Veera Levara (1995) and introducing cowboy genre to the Telugu screen. He starred in the spy films Gudachari 116 (1966), James Bond 777 (1971), Agent Gopi (1978), Rahasya Gudachari (1981) and Gudachari 117 (1989). Krishna directed Sankharavam (1987), Mugguru Kodukulu (1988), Koduku Diddina Kapuram (1989), Bala Chandrudu (1990) and Anna Thammudu (1990), casting his son Mahesh Babu in pivotal roles. Krishna directed 17 feature films and produced many films under his Padmalaya Studios production company along with his brothers Adiseshagiri Rao and Hanumantha Rao. Krishna was one of the highest-paid Telugu actors during his time.

Krishna collaborated with several notable directors of the time such as Adurthi Subba Rao, V. Madhusudhana Rao, K. Viswanath, Bapu, Dasari Narayana Rao and K. Raghavendra Rao. He also has the record of pairing up with the same actress for more than 48 films with Vijaya Nirmala and 47 films with Jaya Prada. In December 2012, at the age of 69, Krishna announced his retirement from politics.

Early and personal life
Krishna was born on 31 May 1943 in Burripalem, Guntur district of present-day Andhra Pradesh. His parents are Ghattamaneni Nagaratnamma, Veeraraghavayya Chowdary.

Krishna was married twice, first to Indira Devi and subsequently to Vijaya Nirmala. He had five children in his first marriage: two sons, film producer Ramesh Babu and actor Mahesh Babu, and three daughters, Padmavathi, Manjula Ghattamaneni, and Priyadarshini. Krishna met Vijaya Nirmala on the sets of Sakshi (1967). The pair worked together in over 40 films.

Krishna died from a cardiac arrest on 15 November 2022, at the age of 79.

Film career

Early work: 1962–1965
His career began with minor roles in films such as Kula Gothralu (1961), Padandi Mundhuku (1962), and Paruvu Prathishta (1963). He was then cast in Thene Manasulu (1965) as one of the male leads. Despite commercial pressure being placed on Adurthi Subba Rao, the film director, to drop Krishna, the film was released as originally planned. It was a success and Adurthi repeated the cast for his next film Kanne Manasulu (1966).

Breakthrough: 1966–1975
Krishna was also selected to play the lead role in Doondi and Sunderlal Nehta's hit movie Gudachaari 116 (1966), which brought the spy genre of films to the forefront in Telugu cinema. Though action films were his standard, Krishna also acted in films such as Marapurani Katha (1967), Atthagaaru Kotthakodalu (1968), and Undamma Bottu Pedatha (1968). He also worked with more established actors, such as N. T. Rama Rao and Akkineni Nageswara Rao, in films such as Stree Janma (1967), Niluvu Dopidi (1968), Manchi Kutumbam (1968), Vichithra Kutumbam (1969), Akka Chellellu (1970) during this period.

At this time, Krishna established his own production house, Padmalaya Films and produced several big-budget films such as Agni Pariksha (1970), Mosagallaku Mosagadu (1971), Pandanti Kapuram (1972), Devudu Chesina Manushulu (1973), Alluri Seetharama Raju (1974). With his second wife Vijaya Nirmala, Krishna also set up another production house called Vijaya Krishna movies, and produced some critically acclaimed films, including Meena and Devadasu (1974). Mosagallaki Mosagadu, which brought the Cowboy genre of films in 1971 and Alluri Seetharamaraju, which released in 1974 were sensational in many ways. In 1975, except for Cheekati Velugulu, none of his films of this time made any impact at the box office as people were reluctant to watch him in softer roles after his portrayal of Alluri Seetharama Raju in the eponymous film. He suffered 14 consecutive flops (Devadasu also one of them) after the release of Alluri Seetarama Raju.

Continued success: 1976–1989
In 1976, he produced Paadi Pantalu, written by Maharadhi Tripuraneni, Raja Rajeswari Vilas Coffee Club, and Rama Rajyamloo Raktha Paasam. He also appeared as an actor in Kolleti Kapuram, Bhalee Dongalu and Devudee Gelichaadu.

In the 1977 film Kurukshethram, based on the Mahabharata epic, he appeared as Arjuna. Between 1978 and 1986, he acted in films such as Anna Dammula Sawaal, Kumara Raja, Agent Gopi, Indradanassu, Allari Bulloodu, Sakthi and Agni Parvatam. In 1986, he directed two films, Simhaasanam and Shankharavam.

In Naa Pilupee Prabhanjanam, he satirised the political party Telugu Desam Party, which led to protests by party officials against screening the film.

Later work: 1990–2016
1990 started with average fares; Nagaasthram and Anna Thammudu. Krishna took his longest break from work after Raktha Tharpanam, his last directorial venture in Telugu, tanked at the marquee. Ramesh's failure to capitalize on his blockbuster Bazaar Rowdy would have presumably upset him further during those unsettling times. In 1993, he came back strongly with the unexpected super-success of Pacchani Samsaaram. But it was Varasudu, his second release in the year, which made him the cynosure of the film fraternity again. With the films Number 1 (1994) and Amma Donga (1995) he had other thumping successes. Krishna also directed the Hindi film Ishq Hai Tumse (2004) produced by Padmalaya Tele films, starring Dino Morea and Bipasa Basu, which is the remake of the Telugu film Sampangi in the year 2004.

Andhra University felicitated Mr. Krishna with an honorary doctorate in 2008. For the recognition of his contribution to Telugu film industry as an actor, director, producer, writer government of India gave him Padma Bhushan in 2009.

Political career
Krishna joined the congress under Rajiv Gandhi's leadership, ran in the 1989 elections from the Eluru Parliament Constituency, and won the seat. NTR was leading the National Front at the time Krishna joined, when NTR was at the pinnacle of his political career. By a margin of 71,000 votes, he defeated Bolla Bulliramaiah, the TDP's incumbent MP. However, Krishna was defeated by Bulliramaiah in the ensuing 1991 election by a margin of 47,000 votes.

Death
On 14 November 2022, Krishna suffered from a heart attack and was rushed to a hospital in Hyderabad. His health started deteriorating and was on a ventilator. He died during the early hours on 15 November at the age of 79. On 16 November 2022, Krishna was cremated with full state honours.

Filmography

Awards
Civilian Honors
 Padma Bhushan - 2009
 Doctorate - Andhra University

Nandi Awards
 Nandi Award for Best Actor - Alluri Sita Rama Raju - 1974

NTR National Award
 NTR National Award for the year 2003.

Filmfare Awards South
 Filmfare Lifetime Achievement Award – South in 1997.

References

External links
 

2022 deaths
Telugu male actors
Male actors in Telugu cinema
People from Guntur district
Filmfare Awards South winners
Film producers from Andhra Pradesh
Recipients of the Padma Bhushan in arts
Nandi Award winners
Male actors from Andhra Pradesh
Indian male film actors
Film directors from Andhra Pradesh
20th-century Indian male actors
Telugu film directors
Telugu film producers
20th-century Indian film directors
21st-century Indian film directors
21st-century Indian male actors
India MPs 1989–1991
Lok Sabha members from Andhra Pradesh
1943 births